GSAT-7A is an advanced military communications satellite meant primarily for the Indian Air Force with Indian Army using 30% of capacity.

Overview
GSAT-7A allows IAF to interlink different ground radar stations, ground airbase,  aircraft to aircraft Real-time Control System, Airborne early warning and control (AWACS) aircraft such as Beriev A-50 Phalcon and DRDO AEW&CS. The satellite enhances Network-centric warfare capabilities of the Indian Air Force and its global operations. The satellite is also used by Indian Army's Aviation Corps for real-time control and communication of its aviation operations. India is in the process of acquiring high-altitude and long endurance satellite-controlled UAVs, such as American armed Predator-B or Sea Guardian drones, that can fire at enemy targets from long distances.

As of December 2018, there are 320 dual use or dedicated military satellite in the sky, half of which are owned by the United States, followed by Russia, China and India (14). To boost its network-centric operations, the IAF is also likely to get another satellite GSAT-7C within a few years.

The GSAT-7A, with a mission life of 8 years, is also equipped with the payload of 10 Ku band transponders, which offers several advantages over c-band, such more powerful satellite uplink and downlink signals, smaller antennas, and non-interference of communication signals with terrestrial microwave systems.

Payload:

 10 channels in Ku band with switchable frequency for mobile users.
 Four steerable antennas
 One fixed Gregorian Antenna.

Launch
GSAT-7A weighing  was successfully launched on 19 December 2018 by GSLV Mk II F11 rocket from Second Launch Pad of Satish Dhawan Space Centre. This three-stage launch vehicle 51 meters tall, has a lift-off mass of about 421 tonnes and indigenously developed cryogenic stage.

See also

 Indian military satellites
 GSAT-7
 GSAT
 Indian National Satellite System
 Integrated Space Cell
 List of Indian satellites

References

Communications satellites in geostationary orbit
GSAT satellites
Spacecraft launched by India in 2018
Spacecraft launched by GSLV rockets